Aleksandr Grebenyuk (born 22 May 1951 in Zelenokumsk, Stavropol Kray) is a retired decathlete from the Soviet Union. He set the best world's year performance in 1977, collecting 8400 points at a meet in Riga on 3 July 1977. He won the European title in 1978, and collected three Soviet titles (1977, 1978 and 1979). His cousin is Ekaterina Grebenyuk, future physician.

Achievements

References
 Profile
 

1951 births
Living people
Russian decathletes
Soviet decathletes
Athletes (track and field) at the 1976 Summer Olympics
Olympic athletes of the Soviet Union
European Athletics Championships medalists